During 2001–02, Aston Villa competed in the Premier League (known as the FA Barclaycard Premiership for sponsorship reasons). Aston Villa's early season form was good and the Midlanders even went top briefly at the end of October, but followed that with a run of eleven games with only one win, falling out of the title race. 

John Gregory announced his surprise resignation after four years as Villa manager on 24 January. A host of names were linked with the vacancy, but in the end it was Graham Taylor, who took Villa to promotion in 1988 and second place in the league in 1990, who was appointed manager. Taylor was unable to improve Villa's form, but two wins against Southampton and Chelsea at the end of the season where enough to see Villa finish eighth thus  finishing in the top 10 for the seventh year in succession.

Final league table

Results summary

Results by matchday

Results
Aston Villa's score comes first

Legend

FA Premier League

FA Cup

League Cup

Intertoto Cup

UEFA Cup

Players

First-team squad
Squad at end of season

Left club during season

Reserve squad
The following players made most of their appearances for the reserves this season, but may have also appeared for the reserves or the U-17s, or may have appeared for the first team in a friendly.

U-19 squad
The following players made most of their appearances for the U-19s this season, but may have also appeared for the reserves or the U-17s.

U-17 squad
The following players made most of their appearances for the U-17s this season, but may have also appeared for the reserves or the U-19s.

Other players
The following players did not play for any Aston Villa team this season.

Statistics

Appearances and goals

|-
! colspan=14 style=background:#dcdcdc; text-align:center| Goalkeepers

|-
! colspan=14 style=background:#dcdcdc; text-align:center| Defenders

|-
! colspan=14 style=background:#dcdcdc; text-align:center| Midfielders

|-
! colspan=14 style=background:#dcdcdc; text-align:center| Forwards

|-
! colspan=14 style=background:#dcdcdc; text-align:center| Players transferred out during the season

Starting 11
Considering starts in all competitions

Transfers

In

Out

Notes

References

External links
Aston Villa official website
avfchistory.co.uk 2001–02 season

Aston Villa
Aston Villa F.C. seasons